Mount Fremont is a 7,214-foot-elevation (2,199 m) mountain summit located in Mount Rainier National Park in Pierce County of Washington state. Mount Fremont is a minor peak at the southwest corner of the Sourdough Mountains which are a subset of the Cascade Range. It also the juncture for a small ridge of peaks of similar size running to the northeast. Mount Fremont is situated northwest of the Sunrise Historic District, with a popular trail leading to the Mount Fremont Fire Lookout. Access is limited by snowpack closing the Sunrise Road much of the year. July, August, and September are typically the months when the Sunrise Road is seasonally open for vehicle traffic. Precipitation runoff from Mount Fremont drains into the White River.

Climate
Mount Fremont is located in the marine west coast climate zone of western North America. Most weather fronts originate in the Pacific Ocean, and travel northeast toward the Cascade Mountains. As fronts approach, they are forced upward by the peaks of the Cascade Range (Orographic lift), causing them to drop their moisture in the form of rain or snowfall onto the Cascades. As a result, the west side of the Cascades experiences high precipitation, especially during the winter months in the form of snowfall. During winter months, weather is usually cloudy, but, due to high pressure systems over the Pacific Ocean that intensify during summer months, there is often little or no cloud cover during the summer. Because of maritime influence, snow tends to be wet and heavy, resulting in high avalanche danger.

History
Mount Fremont honors John C. Frémont (1813-1890), who was an American explorer, politician, and soldier. His explorations of the Oregon Territory stimulated the American desire to own that region. His journals recorded that Mount Rainier was erupting in November 1843. This feature's name was officially adopted in 1932 by the U.S. Board on Geographic Names.

See also

 Geography of Washington (state)
 Geology of the Pacific Northwest

Gallery

References

External links
 Mount Fremont: weather forecast
 National Park Service web site: Mount Rainier National Park

Cascade Range
Mountains of Pierce County, Washington
Mountains of Washington (state)
Mount Rainier National Park
North American 2000 m summits